Zaccagni is a surname. Notable people with the surname include:

Bernardino Zaccagni ( 1455–1531), Italian architect
Lorenzo Alessandro Zaccagni (1652–1712), Italian librarian and Patristic scholar and author
Mattia Zaccagni (born 1995), Italian footballer

Italian-language surnames